Wildeck Castle or Wildeck Palace is an old hunting lodge in Zschopau in Saxony.  It stands on a rocky spur above the River Zschopau.

Site 
The site today forms an irregular triangle, the narrow wing of the castle surrounding the courtyard, with its bergfried known as Dicker Heinrich or "Fat Henry", faces the River Zschopau; the side facing the town is sealed by a wall. The staircase tower in the corner of two wings is called Schlanke Margarete or "Skinny Margaret".

Literature 
 
 Autorenkollektiv: Geschichte der Stadt Zschopau. Entstehung bis 1945. Zschopau, 1989.
 Heinz Bauer: Die Zschopauer Burg. Probleme ihrer Datierung. In: Erzgebirgische Heimatblätter 15(1993)5, pp. 6–9, 
 Eberhard Hahn: Schloss Wildeck in Zschopau einst und jetzt. In: Erzgebirgische Heimatblätter 26(2004)1, pp. 2–5,

External links 

 Website of Wildeck Castle

Hunting lodges in Germany
Castles in Saxony
Ore Mountains
Buildings and structures in Erzgebirgskreis